Stara Dąbrowa , (German Alt Damerow) is a village in Stargard County, West Pomeranian Voivodeship, in north-western Poland. It is the seat of the gmina (administrative district) called Gmina Stara Dąbrowa.

The village has a population of 618.

References

Villages in Stargard County

pl:Stara Dąbrowa (województwo zachodniopomorskie)